In applied mathematics, the Sommerfeld radiation condition is a concept from theory of differential equations and scattering theory used for choosing a particular solution to the Helmholtz equation. It was introduced by Arnold Sommerfeld in 1912
and is closely related to the limiting absorption principle (1905) and the limiting amplitude principle (1948).

Formulation

Arnold Sommerfeld defined the condition of radiation for a scalar field satisfying the Helmholtz equation as 

 "the sources must be sources, not sinks of energy. The energy which is radiated from the sources must scatter to infinity; no energy may be radiated from infinity into ... the field."

Mathematically, consider the inhomogeneous Helmholtz equation

A solution  to this equation is called radiating if it satisfies the Sommerfeld radiation condition

 

uniformly in all directions 

 

The Sommerfeld radiation condition is used to solve uniquely the Helmholtz equation. For example, consider the problem of radiation due to a point source  in three dimensions, so the function  in the Helmholtz equation is  where  is the Dirac delta function.  This problem has an infinite number of solutions, for example, any function of the form 

where  is a constant, and 

 

Of all these solutions, only  satisfies the Sommerfeld radiation condition and corresponds to a field radiating from  The other solutions are unphysical . For example,  can be interpreted as energy coming from infinity and sinking at

See also

 Limiting absorption principle
 Limiting amplitude principle
Nonradiation condition

References

 "Eighty years of Sommerfeld’s radiation condition", Steven H. Schot, Historia Mathematica 19, #4 (November 1992), pp. 385–401, .

External links
 

Radiation
Boundary conditions